David "Sarge" Saunders (born April 6, 1958) is an American football coach and educator. He served as the head football coach at Millsaps College from 2003 to 2005 and Pearl River Community College in 2016.

Saunders was once named one of the nation's top nine recruiters by ESPN.com's Tom Lemming. During his coaching career, Saunders coached over 20 future National Football League (NFL) players.

Head coaching career
Saunders was named head football coach at Millsaps College in Jackson, Mississippi in 2003 and held the position through the 2005 season. He had an overall record of 7–21 and a 5–13 conference record in the Southern Collegiate Athletic Conference.

Saunders had a 2–7 record in his one season as head coach at Pearl River Community College in 2016.

Assistant coaching career
Saunders first college coaching job was at Jacksonville State University from 1984 to 1989 as defensive backs coach, wide receivers coach and recruiting coordinator. From 1990 to 1992 he was defensive line coach at Georgia Southern, where the 1990 team won the Division I-AA National Championship.

From 1993 to 1994 Saunders was defensive coordinator and defensive backs coach at Nicholls State University. In 1995, Saunders moved to Baylor University as safeties coach.

During the 1996a and 1997 seasons, Saunders was defensive backs coach and recruiting coordinator at Arkansas State University. In 1998, he spent the football season at the University of Tennessee working as an on-campus recruiting coordinator.

From 1999 to 2002, Saunders was an assistant to the athletics director for recruiting and coordinator of high school and community college relations at Ole Miss. In 2006, he returned to Ole Miss as linebackers coach. Saunders again returned to Ole Miss for a third time as administrative operations coordinator in 2010.

From 2011 to 2014, he was defensive backs coach at the University of Louisiana–Lafayette.

In 2015, Saunders was defensive backs coach and special teams coordinator at Pearl River Community College.

Personal life
Saunders is an alumnus of Auburn University.

Head coaching record

College

References

1958 births
Living people
Arkansas State Red Wolves football coaches
Baylor Bears football coaches
Georgia Southern Eagles football coaches
Jacksonville State Gamecocks football coaches
Louisiana Ragin' Cajuns football coaches
Millsaps Majors football coaches
Nicholls Colonels football coaches
Ole Miss Rebels football coaches
Tennessee Volunteers football coaches
Junior college football coaches in the United States
Auburn University alumni